Noryang is an upcoming South Korean war action film directed by Kim Han-min. It is the third and final film of Kim's trilogy about battles led by Yi Sun-sin, that started with 2014 film The Admiral: Roaring Currents and followed by 2022 film Hansan: Rising Dragon. The film depicts the historical Battle of Noryang, the last major battle of the Japanese invasions of Korea (1592–1598).

Cast 
 Kim Yoon-seok as Yi Sun-sin
 Baek Yoon-sik as Shimazu
 Jung Jae-young as Chen Lin
 Huh Joon-ho as Deng Zilong
 Yeo Jin-goo (cameo)
 Lee Je-hoon as young Gwang-hae

Production

Development 

In 2013, while producing The Admiral: Roaring Currents, Big Stone Pictures revealed their plans to produce two more films related to Yi Sun-sin, titled Appearance of Hansan Dragon and Noryang Sea of Death as sequels, depending on the success of The Admiral. Following the box office success of The Admiral which became the most-watched and highest-grossing film of all time in South Korea, production of the sequels was confirmed.

Filming 
Principal photography began on January 14, 2021, and wrapped on June 15, 2021.

Release 
The release is expected in December 2023.

References

External links
 
 
 

Upcoming films
2020s historical adventure films
2020s action war films
South Korean historical action films
South Korean action drama films
South Korean historical adventure films
South Korean war drama films
2020s Korean-language films
Films about Japan–Korea relations
Films about naval warfare
Films set in the Joseon dynasty
War adventure films
Action films based on actual events
War films based on actual events
Cultural depictions of Yi Sun-sin
Lotte Entertainment films
Films about the Japanese invasions of Korea (1592–1598)